The men's ISSF 25 meter rapid fire pistol event at the 2012 Olympic Games was held on 2 and 3 August 2012 at the Royal Artillery Barracks. There were 18 competitors from 13 nations. The event was won by Leuris Pupo of Cuba. Silver went to Vijay Kumar of India, while Ding Feng of China took bronze. It was the first medal in the event for all three nations. Ralf Schumann missed the final for the first time; he had reached the final in the previous six Games (winning five medals, three gold and two silver).

Background

This was the 24th appearance of what had been standardised in 1948 as the men's ISSF 25 meter rapid fire pistol event, the only event on the 2020 programme that traces back to 1896. The event has been held at every Summer Olympics except 1904 and 1928 (when no shooting events were held) and 1908; it was nominally open to women from 1968 to 1980, although very few women participated these years. There is no women's equivalent on the Olympic programme, as of 2021. The first five events were quite different, with some level of consistency finally beginning with the 1932 event—which, though it had differences from the 1924 competition, was roughly similar. The 1936 competition followed the 1932 one quite closely. The post-World War II event substantially altered the competition once again. The 1984 Games introduced women's-only shooting events, including the ISSF 25 meter pistol (though this is more similar to the non-Olympic men's ISSF 25 meter center-fire pistol than the rapid fire pistol).

Five of the six finalists from 2008 returned: silver medalist (and 1992, 1996, and 2004 gold and 1988 silver medalist) Ralf Schumann of Germany, bronze medalist Christian Reitz of Germany, fourth-place finisher Leonid Yekimov of Russia, fifth-place finisher Keith Sanderson of the United States, and sixth-place finisher Roman Bondaruk of Ukraine. The 2010 world champion and runner-up were Alexei Klimov of Russia and Zhang Jian of China, respectively. Klimov held the world record for the qualifying round and shared the world record with Reitz for the new final round format.

This was the third Games in which no nation made its debut in the event. The United States made its 20th appearance, most of any nation.

Qualification

Each National Olympic Committee (NOC) could enter up to two shooters if the NOC earned enough quota sports or had enough crossover-qualified shooters. To compete, a shooter needed a quota spot and to achieve a Minimum Qualification Score (MQS). Once a shooter was using a quota spot in any shooting event, they could enter any other shooting event for which they had achieved the MQS as well (a crossover qualification). There were 16 quota spots available for the rapid fire pistol: 2 at the 2010 World Championship, 8 at the 2011 World Cup events (2 spots at each of 4 events), and 6 for continental champions (2 each for Europe and Asia, 1 each for Americas and Oceania). There was also 1 re-allocated place. In 2012, one crossover qualification was used in the rapid fire pistol: Jakkrit Panichpatikum of Thailand had qualified and used a quota spot in the 50 metre pistol and also achieved the rapid fire pistol MQS; he competed in both events (as well as the 10 metre air pistol).

Competition format

The competition format continued to use the two-round (qualifying round and final) format, as in 1988 and since 1996, with the third final format in as many Games. The 2005 rules changes also required the pistols used to be sport pistols, banning .22 Short cartridges.

The qualifying round from 1988 onward was essentially the same as the full competition format from 1948–1984. Each shooter fired 60 shots. These were done in two courses of 30; each course consisted of two stages of 15; each stage consisted of three series of 5. In each stage, the time limit for each series was 8 seconds for the first, 6 seconds for the second, and 4 seconds for the third. 

The 1988 tournament had added a two-series final for the top eight shooters; the 1992 competition broke that down to a four-series semifinal for the top eight and two-series final for the top four. In 1996 and 2000, the top eight once again advanced to the final. The 2004 version had reduced the number of finalists to six, where it stayed in 2008 and 2012.

Prior to 2008, the final involved two series of 5 shots at 4 seconds. In 2008, that was expanded to four series. The 2012 competition used an entirely different format, however. The competition switched to a "hit-or-miss" system, where a 9.7 or better scores as a "hit" for 1 point and anything lower scores as a "miss" for 0 points. The final featured 8 series of 5 shots each (5 points maximum per series, 40 points maximum total). However, starting with the fourth series, the remaining shooter with the lowest total was eliminated after each series (5 shooters remaining in the fifth series, 4 in the sixth, 3 in the seventh, and only 2 in the eighth and final series).

The 1992 competition had introduced round targets rather than the silhouettes used from 1948 to 1988 as well as many pre-World War II versions of the event. Score, rather than hits, had been used as the primary ranking method since 1960.

Records

Prior to this competition, the existing world and Olympic records were as follows.

Schedule

Results

Qualifying

Final

References

1. 

Shooting at the 2012 Summer Olympics
Men's 2012
Men's events at the 2012 Summer Olympics